Gabriel's Landing, also known as Old Oak Point, is a historic estate located at Wilmington, New Hanover County, North Carolina. The main house was built 1936, and consists of a -story, five bay, central section flanked by one-story recessed wings in the Colonial Revival style.  The front facade features a one-story piazza, and the house has a ceramic tile shingle roof.  Also on the property is a contributing cottage (c. 1936), cabin (c. 1936), two-story barn (c. 1936), and stable (c. 1936).

It was listed on the National Register of Historic Places in 2008.

References

Houses on the National Register of Historic Places in North Carolina
Colonial Revival architecture in North Carolina
Houses completed in 1936
Buildings and structures in Wilmington, North Carolina
National Register of Historic Places in New Hanover County, North Carolina
Houses in New Hanover County, North Carolina